Buraro Robidok Bagewa Detudamo (1931 – 5 June 1994) was a Nauruan politician. He was the only son of Timothy Detudamo and brother-in-law to Kennan Adeang. When Buraro was a boy, his family went to Chuuk Islands.

Detudamo served as a member of the Nauru Local Government Council, the Nauru Legislative Council, and the Parliament of Nauru. He also served as Minister Assisting the President of Nauru in all of the cabinets of Hammer DeRoburt between 1968 and 1989. He was also Minister of Finance under Hammer DeRoburt from December 1978 to April 1979.

In 1992, Buraro Detudamo was the opposition candidate for the presidency, losing to Bernard Dowiyogo in a 7–10 vote. Detudamo held the position of Minister of Public Works.

References

Members of the Parliament of Nauru
1931 births
1994 deaths
Finance Ministers of Nauru
Government ministers of Nauru
Ministers Assisting the President of Nauru
20th-century Nauruan politicians